Kentucky Route 2158 is a north–south highway in Warren County, Kentucky. It parallels Interstate 65 (I-65) for all of its length. It is known locally as Cumberland Trace.

Route description
KY 2158 starts at a junction with U.S. Route 231 (US 231), known locally as Scottsville Road.  north of this intersection, KY 2158 has a junction with KY 2629, a west–east route that begins at this point.

KY 2158 then continues north for another  before reaching its terminus at KY 234, just east of the exit 26 interchange with I-65.

From its beginning until the intersection with KY 2629, KY 2158 is surrounded primarily by commercial development. North of the intersection, the highway is primarily surrounded by residential development.

Major intersections

References

External links

KY Roads Homepage

2158
Transportation in Warren County, Kentucky